Patrick Henry High School is a public secondary school in Minneapolis, Minnesota, United States. It is located in the city's Camden neighborhood. The school is named for American Founding Father Patrick Henry and is referred to colloquially by community members as "Patrick Henry" or "Henry". It had a student population of about 1,000 by the early 2020s.

History

Renovations 
After renovations in the late 1990s moved the main entrance, the address of the school became 4320 Newton Avenue North.

Name change 
In 2018, community members reexamined the legacy of naming the school for Patrick Henry—a slave owner.  In the aftermath of the George Floyd protests in Minneapolis–Saint Paul, an advisory committee to the Minneapolis Public Schools unanimously approved a name-change process for the high school, with funding to rebrand the school at some point during the 2022-2023 school year.

Academics 
Like all Minneapolis high schools, Henry is composed of several "small learning communities" or SLCs. Henry's premier program is its International Baccalaureate program, which draws from  parts of North, Northeast, Southeast, and some of South Minneapolis. The Class of 2007 featured twenty IB Diploma candidates. Henry also has an Engineering program, and a liberal arts program. The school is IB Certified for Diploma Programme (DP) and is also certified for IB's Middle Years Programme (MYP) as well.

U.S. News & World Report ranked Patrick Henry as the 68th best in Minnesota in 2022. Among schools with equivalent levels of poverty, Patrick Henry is one of very few in the country showing significant academic success.

For many years, Henry struggled with low enrollment and poor academic quality. Since the 1990s, however, the school has benefited from the introduction of the IB program, corporate grants, a mentorship program for new teachers, and the strong leadership of former principals Cheryl Creecy, Michael Huerth (a recipient of the Milken Family Foundation's National Education Award), and Paul McMahan. The transition from being known as "Minneapolis Henry" to being called "Patrick Henry" occurred under Principal McMahan as part of the school's renaissance.

Recent Patrick Henry graduates have been accepted and have matriculated to various prestigious colleges and universities, including: Harvard University, Tuskegee University, Carleton College, Purdue University, Dartmouth College, Emory University, and Brown University (among others).

Athletics
Henry's most notable sports team in recent years has been its boys' basketball team, which won four straight state championships in the AAA division under coach Larry McKenzie from 2000 to 2003. The team had some success before then as well, reaching the state final in 1998, and often defeating its rival North High School, led at the time by Khalid El-Amin. The basketball team previously won state championships in 1944 and 1945. The alpine skiing team won the state championship in 1941, and the boys' track and field team won the state championship in the AA division in 1990, led by "Leapin'" Leonard Jones.

Although the school had a thriving men's hockey team, the shift in demographics coincided with a decline in the interest in the sport. The sport was dropped at Patrick Henry. By 2010, both all hockey teams at all seven Minneapolis public high schools were merged into a collective Minneapolis boys team and girls team.

Beyond the sports, Henry has a vast array of other extracurriculars, the most notable of which being their math and robotics teams.  Henry has one of the largest math teams in the city; coach John Heisel has managed to recruit a considerable number of students every year. Henry's robotics team, Herobotics, is known as one of the top teams in the state of Minnesota; they have won many awards, and advanced to the FIRST Championship seven times in their ten-year history.

Notable alumni
 William Albert Allard, photographer, class of 1955
 Bee Vang, actor in Gran Torino (attended 9th grade at Patrick Henry, graduated from Roosevelt)
 Michael Hegstrand, best known as Road Warrior Hawk in World Wrestling Federation, class of 1976
 Ade Olufeko, technologist and entrepreneur
 Rob Antony, General Manager and Executive Vice-President of Minnesota Twins, class of 1984 
 Phil Williams, regional southpaw professional boxer
 Ed Flanders, actor in films and TV series St. Elsewhere, class of 1953
 Toki Wright, regionally known rapper and educator
 Larry H. Smith, U.S. national hockey player
 Jim McIntyre, former University of Minnesota basketball player
 Mike Ward, musician, founding member of the band The Wallflowers
 Tom Hirsch, hockey player
 Scott Norton, professional wrestler
 Tony Andreason, musician with The Trashmen, class of 1962

References

External links

 School Website
 Google Maps

High schools in Minneapolis
Minneapolis Public Schools
International Baccalaureate schools in Minnesota
Educational institutions established in 1937
Public high schools in Minnesota
1937 establishments in Minnesota